Yosef "Yossi" Ahimeir (born 19 May 1943) is an Israeli journalist and former politician, chief editor of the Hebrew ideological quarterly - "Ha-Umma". Since April 2005 he is also the director-general of the Jabotinsky Institute in Israel. Today, Ahimeir is member of the directorate of Yad Vashem and of International Board of Governors of the Ariel University Center of Samaria.

Biography
Ahimeir was born in Jerusalem during the Mandate era, the son of the journalist and historian Abba Ahimeir. He gained a BA from Tel Aviv University, and began working as a journalist at HaYom, the Gahal-affiliated newspaper, in 1966. In 1969 he moved to Ma'ariv, where he worked until 1984.

In 1984 he became assistant to Prime Minister Yitzhak Shamir. In 1988 he was appointed Director of the Prime Minister's Office, a post he held until Shamir lost the 1992 elections.

Ahimeir was on the Likud list for the elections, and although he failed to win a seat, he entered the Knesset on 7 August 1995 as a replacement for the deceased Haim Kaufman. However, he lost his seat in the 1996 elections.

His brother, Ya'akov Ahimeir, is also a journalist.

References

External links

1943 births
Living people
Politicians from Jerusalem
Jews in Mandatory Palestine
Ariel University
Tel Aviv University alumni
Israeli journalists
Israeli civil servants
Likud politicians
Members of the 13th Knesset (1992–1996)
Yad Vashem people
Journalists from Jerusalem